Bhuj railway station (station code:- BHUJ) is a Class-A railway station in Bhuj, Gujarat, India, on the Western line of the Western Railway network. It is the last station on the Western Railway line in the area. It handles nine trains.

References

External links

Railway stations in Kutch district
Ahmedabad railway division
Transport in Bhuj